Achiet may refer to two communes in the Pas-de-Calais department in northern France:
 Achiet-le-Grand
 Achiet-le-Petit